Thursby may refer to

Surname
Cecil Thursby (1861–1936), British Royal Navy admiral
Emma Cecilia Thursby (1845-1931), American singer
Floyd Thursby, a fictional character in The Maltese Falcon (novel)

Other uses
Thursby, a village in north-western England
Thursby Baronets, an extinct title in the Baronetage of the United Kingdom

See also
Sir John Thursby Community College in Lancashire, England
Louis P. Thursby House in Orange City, Florida